The San Carlos Hotel, sometimes called the Hotel San Carlos and affectionately dubbed the Gray Lady of Palafox, was a grand and revered hotel in Pensacola, Florida, for much of the 20th century.

The San Carlos Hotel was the project of local businessmen James Michael Muldon, Sr. (1867-1932) and Frasier Franklin Bingham (1872-1953) (lumber magnate and shipbuilder), who saw the need for the kind of upscale hotel being erected in larger cities, and issued stock in the project under the name Pensacola Hotel Company. Regarding the site, their original choice was the northeast corner of Palafox and Garden Streets, which had no significant structures at the time. However, they instead purchased the northwest corner (at the cost of $75,000) from the First Methodist Church, which was relocating to Wright Street. The Methodists had purchased the property from Colonel Chandler Cox Yonge (1818-1889) in 1882 for an old Tarragona Street church building valued at $1,500 plus $100 "to boot."

The hotel was designed by New York architect William Lee Stoddart and erected by local firm C. H. Turner Construction Co. at the cost of $500,000. A sturdy beam-and-girder structural system, designed to withstand hurricane winds, was covered by ceramic tile and stucco. The name "San Carlos" was selected on January 15, 1909, and site clearing began thereafter. As the Pensacola Journal explained:

Ground was broken in April 1909, and construction was completed in 1910. It opened its doors on the first day of Mardi Gras celebrations. The hotel had its own well, with a rooftop cistern and purification system, and the original 157 rooms each had an exterior window and modern furnishings.

Muldon and Bingham leased operation of the hotel to brothers Charles Bedell Hervey (1874-1942) and George Hancock Hervey (1880-1949) of the Hervey Hotel Company (of Mobile, Alabama)  until 1919, and then to the Newcomb Hotel Company until 1922, when it was sold to lumber magnate William Byrd Harbeson, Sr. (1861-1934) and managed for 20 years by Harbeson's son-in-law Lee Conner Hagler (1890-1943). The new owners soon announced a massive expansion on the north and west sides of the hotel that maintained a consistent facade and added 246 rooms, a ballroom, a new lobby, and space for offices and shops. New Orleans architect Emile Weil (1878-1945) and associate architect Walker Dorr Willis, Sr. (1882-1968) were responsible for these renovations, with kitchen and food services upgrades completed by the Albert Pick-Barth Companies.

WCOA began broadcasting there in 1932. Artist Joy Postle painted murals in the main lobby and dining room.

The San Carlos Hotel ceased operations in 1982 and lay vacant for more than a decade. A proposal by Baptist Health Care to convert it to retirement apartments failed to materialize. Despite it being added to the National Register of Historic Places, the hotel was demolished in 1993. A new United States Courthouse was built on the site in 1998 (designated the Winston E. Arnow Federal Building in 2010.).

Images

References

External links
Vintagevacationphotos.com: photo of the Hotel San Carlos in 1953

Buildings and structures in Pensacola, Florida
Demolished hotels in Florida
Commercial buildings completed in 1910
Buildings and structures demolished in 1993
Former National Register of Historic Places in Florida
Hotels established in 1910
1910 establishments in Florida
History of Pensacola, Florida